This is a list of current, upcoming and former programmes broadcast on the Indian television Tamil-language channel Sun TV.

Current programming

Current Fiction

Dubbed series

Former programming

Dramas
Original series

Dubbed series

Reality shows
Asatha Povathu Yaaru? (2007)
Champions (2013–2014)
Chellame Chellam (2015–2016)
Chumma Kizhi (2021)
Comedy Junction (2016–2017)
Cinema Seithigal (2016)
Deala No Deala (2009–2012)
Hello Sago (2019)
Imsai Arasigal (2018)
Kitchen Galatta (2015–2017)
Kaiyil Oru Kodi (2012)
Kutty Chutties Season 1 (2012-2017) & Season 2 (2019-2020)
MasterChef India – Tamil (2021)
MasterChef India – Tamil Season 1 (2021) 
Masthana Masthana (2007–2009)
Mathi Yosi (2022–2023)
Namma Ooru Hero (2019)
Nijam (2006-2011)
Nijangal (2016–2017)
Natchathira Sangamam (2016)
O Podu (2017)
Pepsi Ungal Choice (2020)
Rajaparvai (2021)
Rowdy Baby (2021)
Sapthaswarangal (1993–2006)
Savaale Samali (2017–2018)
Sirippulogam (2012)
Sun Naam Oruvar (2018–2019)
Sun Singer (2013–2017)
Super Challenge (2015–2017)
Super Kudumbam (2023)
Super Sister (2019)
Super 10 (2020)
Thanga Vettai (2005–2006)
Thiruvalar Thirumathi (2007)

List of films

Telefilms
List of films made exclusive for television release.

References

Sun TV
Sun TV
Sun TV